Angelika Dubinski (born 30 July 1995 in Georgsmarienhütte, Germany) is a German figure skater. She is the 2012 German national junior champion.

Programs

Results

References

External links 

 
 Profil at figureskatingonline
 Tracings.net profile
 The Figure Skating Corner profile

1995 births
Living people
German female single skaters
People from Georgsmarienhütte
Sportspeople from Lower Saxony